Nicky Tyrone Little (born 13 September 1976) is a New Zealand born rugby union footballer. He plays at fly-half. He is a nephew of All Blacks centre Walter Little, but represents Fiji at international level.

Career
He has scored 652 points for Fiji and is the Pacific region's second highest point scorer of players who are currently active. He previously played for Canterbury and North Harbour in New Zealand provincial rugby, before moving to England where he played for the Sale Sharks in late 1999. He signed with Dax in France, but soon moved to Pontypridd, before signing with the Saracens.

Little made his test debut for Fiji in 1996 in a match against the Springboks in Pretoria, at just 19 years of age. He finished the 2000 and 2001 Pacific Rim tournaments as the top points scorer. He entered the 2003 Rugby World Cup as Fiji's all-time highest points scorer, with 488 points. He got four caps for Fiji at the 2003 World Cup, scoring a total of 45 points in those games. At the 2007 event he starred as Fiji defeated Wales to reach the quarter-finals, but was injured late in the final group game, after straining his medial knee ligaments and missed the quarter-final.

On 15 July 2009, it was announced that Little had signed a one-year deal with Bath, with Head Coach Steve Meehan stating that he would be in the squad for the tour to Portugal in late July 2009.

On 26 February 2010 it was announced that Little would be playing for Bristol Rugby from the 2010–11 season onwards. But at the end of the 2010/2011 season it was announced that Little would be part of the clearout of players departing Bristol Rugby.

At the midpoint of the 2011/12 season, it was announced that Little was joining RFU Championship side Esher RFC.

At the start of the 2012/13 season Little became part of a joint venture with Simon Langton Grammar School for Boys, and The Canterbury High School. Canterbury's Elite Rugby Player Development Centre, headed by Little, is the first of its kind within the country and its aim is to develop grass roots rugby within the area.

References

External links
Pontypridd profile
Bath Rugby
Fiji profile
Scrum profile

1976 births
Fijian rugby union players
Living people
Rugby union fly-halves
Canterbury rugby union players
North Harbour rugby union players
Pontypridd RFC players
Sale Sharks players
Saracens F.C. players
Bath Rugby players
Rugby union players from Tokoroa
Fiji international rugby union players
New Zealand people of Fijian descent
Fijian expatriate rugby union players
New Zealand expatriate rugby union players
Expatriate rugby union players in France
Expatriate rugby union players in England
Expatriate rugby union players in Scotland
Expatriate rugby union players in Wales
New Zealand expatriate sportspeople in England
New Zealand expatriate sportspeople in France
New Zealand expatriate sportspeople in Scotland
New Zealand expatriate sportspeople in Wales
Fijian expatriate sportspeople in England
Fijian expatriate sportspeople in France
People educated at Te Awamutu College